The Gotha G.X was an experimental bomber aircraft designed and built in Germany from 1917.

Development 
The Gotha G.X was an experimental bomber with a general arrangement similar to the Gotha G.V. This relatively small aircraft was powered by two 180 hp B.M.W. IIIa engines and had two-bay wings with auxiliary struts outboard of the engine nacelles.

See also

References

 Gray, Peter & Thetford, Owen. “German Aircraft of the First World War”. London, Putnam. 
 Taylor, Michael J.H. . “ Jane's Encyclopedia of Aviation. Studio Editions. London. 1989.  

1910s German bomber aircraft
G.X
Aircraft first flown in 1918